A press conference or news conference is a media event in which notable individuals or organizations invite journalists to hear them speak and ask questions. Press conferences are often held by politicians, corporations, non-governmental organizations, as well as organizers for newsworthy events.

Practice
In a press conference, one or more speakers may make a statement, which may be followed by questions from reporters. Sometimes only questioning occurs; sometimes there is a statement with no questions permitted.

A media event at which no statements are made, and no questions allowed, is called a photo op. A government may wish to open their proceedings for the media to witness events, such as the passing of a piece of legislation from the government in parliament to the senate, via a media availability.

American television stations and networks especially value press conferences: because today's TV news programs air for hours at a time, or even continuously, assignment editors have a steady appetite for ever-larger quantities of footage.

News conferences are often held by politicians; by sports teams; by celebrities or film studios; by commercial organizations to promote products; by attorneys to promote lawsuits; and by almost anyone who finds benefit in the free publicity afforded by media coverage. Some people, including many police chiefs, hold press conferences reluctantly in order to avoid dealing with reporters individually.

A press conference is often announced by sending an advisory or news release to assignment editors, preferably well in advance. Sometimes they are held spontaneously when several reporters gather around a newsmaker.

News conferences can be held just about anywhere, in settings as formal as the White House room set aside for the purpose or as informal as the street in front of a crime scene. Hotel conference rooms and courthouses are often used for press conferences. Sometimes such gatherings are recorded for press use and later released on an interview disc.

Media day
Media day is a special press conference event where rather than holding a conference after an event to field questions about the event that has recently transpired, a conference is held for the sole purpose of making newsmakers available to the media for general questions and photographs often before an event or series of events (such as an athletic season) occur. In athletics, teams and leagues host media days prior to the season and may host them prior to special events during the season like all-star games and championship games.

See also

Media scrum
Press videoconferencing
Pseudo-event
Message discipline
Press release
Press service
Fact sheet
Grassroots
Public relations
Science by press conference

Photos

References

Sources (journalism)
Public relations techniques
Mass media events